Archips rileyanus, the southern ugly-nest caterpillar moth, is a species of moth of the family Tortricidae. It is found in North America, where it has been recorded from Alabama, Florida, Georgia, Maine, Mississippi, Missouri, North Carolina, Ohio, Tennessee, Texas, Virginia and West Virginia.

The wingspan is 19–26 mm. Adults have been recorded on wing in March and from May to July.

The larvae feed on Aesculus (including Aesculus californica and Aesculus pavia), Carya, Cornus, Juglans, Prunus, Symphoricarpos and Vernonia species.

References

Moths described in 1868
Archips
Moths of North America